Aḥmad ibn Muḥammad ibn al-Faqih al-Hamadani (fl. 902) was a 10th-century Persian historian and geographer, famous for his Mukhtasar Kitab al-Buldan ("Concise Book of Lands") written in Arabic.

In the 1870s the Dutch orientalist Michael Jan de Goeje edited a selection of geography works of Arab geographers in an eight-volume series titled Bibliotheca geographorum Arabicorum published by Lugduni-Batavae (Leiden) Brill publishers.  Al-Hamadhānī's Mukhtasar Kitab al-Buldan was published in volume 5 of this series.

In 1967 second editions were printed by Dar Sadir (Beirut) and E.J. Brill (Lugduni Batavorum).

See also 
 Manuscript 5229.

References

Persian explorers
10th-century Iranian geographers
10th-century Iranian historians
10th-century geographers
Geographers from the Abbasid Caliphate
People from Hamadan